Henri Marie Camille Édouard Alby (5 November 1858 – 11 February 1935) was a French army general who served during the First World War. Following the armistice, he was appointed Chief of the Army Staff.

Biography 

Henri was born in Marseille to Joseph Alby and his wife Hortense Pichaud. His brother was engineer Amédée Alby.

In 1878, he started attending the School of Artillery and Engineering at Fontainebleau. After two years, he was commissioned as second lieutenant and assigned to the 1st Engineering Regiment. There, he served for a year before being promoted to lieutenant, and participated to the French conquest of Algeria during the pacification of the territories south of Oran. In 1883, his promotion to captain was followed by an assignment to the Engineering General Staff. He joined the Superior War School for two years in 1885.

On 11 February 1893, he married his cousin Amélie Jeanne Eugénie de Barrau de Muratel. He received the Legion of Honour in July 1895 and was gradually promoted to battalion chief (major) in 1897, lieutenant colonel in 1904 and colonel in 1907.

Henri Alby rose to the rank of brigade general in 1911, then division general in 1915 and was put in charge of the 13th Corps during the First World War.

Alby was awarded the Distinguished Service Medal after the First World War for his services to the American Expeditionary Forces.

Toward the end of the War, Alby was made Major General of the Army Staff and acting Chief of the Army Staff under Ferdinand Foch, who notionally retained that position despite having also become Supreme Allied Commander in March 1918. Alby finally became Chief of the Army Staff in December 1918, a month after the armistice, replacing Marshal Foch who remained Supreme Allied Commander until 1920. His future successor to the position, General Edmond Buat, wrote in his personal journal his dismay over Alby's appointment at the time:

Decorations 
 Legion of Honour
 Grand Officer – 10 July 1918
 Commander – 25 March 1915
 Officer – 11 July 1912
 Knight – 9 July 1895
 War Cross 1914–1918
 U.S. Army Distinguished Service Medal

Citations 
For his promotion to Commander of the Legion of Honour :

References

External links  
 Services records of General Alby

1858 births
1935 deaths
French military personnel of World War I
Grand Officiers of the Légion d'honneur
Recipients of the Croix de Guerre 1914–1918 (France)
Recipients of the Distinguished Service Medal (US Army)
20th-century French military personnel
19th-century French military personnel